Oudemansiella is a genus of fungi in the family Physalacriaceae. The genus contains about 15 species that are widely distributed in tropical and temperate regions. Yang and colleagues revised the genus in a 2009 publication, describing several new species and several varieties. They classified species in the genus into four sections based on the structure of the cap cuticle: Oudemansiella,  Mucidula,  Dactylosporina, and  Radicatae.

The genus name of Oudemansiella is in honour of Corneille Antoine Jean Abram Oudemans or Cornelis Antoon Jan Abraham Oudemans (1825–1906), who was a Dutch botanist and physician who specialized in fungal systematics. 

The genus was circumscribed by Carlos Luis Spegazzini in Anales Soc. Ci. Argent. vol.12 on page 23 in 1881.

Species

O. africana
O. alveolata
O. atrocaerulea
O. aureocystidiata
O. australis
O. bii
O. bispora
O. caulovillosa
O. canarii
O. chiangmaiae
O. colensoi
O. crassibasidiata
O. eradicata
O. flavo-olivacea
O. furfuracea
O. gigaspora
O. globospora
O. incognita
O. japonica
O. kenyae
O. latilamellata
O. limonispora
O. macracantha
O. mammicystis
O. megalospora
O. melanotricha
O. mucida
O. mundroola
O. orientiradicata
O. platensis
O. rhodophylla
O. rubrobrunnescens
O. rugosoceps
O. semiglabripes
O. sinopudens
O. steffenii
O. subinucida
O. superbiens
O. tetrasperma
O. trichofera
O. variabilis
O. vinocontusa

Gallery

References

External links

Physalacriaceae
Taxa named by Carlo Luigi Spegazzini